Los Incas, also known as Urubamba, are an Andean folk music group formed in Paris in 1956. Founded by the Argentinian musicians Carlos Miguel Ben-Pott and Ricardo Galeazzi who was a jazz bassist, musical director of the group and the Venezuelans Elio Riveros and Narciso Debourg. Since the beginning of the 1960s, it had been constantly directed musically by the Argentinian Jorge Milchberg (born 5 September 1928 - died 20 August 2022), who, originally a classically trained pianist, had become an internationally renowned charanguist.

They are best known in North America for accompanying Simon and Garfunkel on the song "El Cóndor Pasa (If I Could)", written by Daniel Alomía Robles, Paul Simon and Jorge Milchberg and included on the duo's fifth album, Bridge Over Troubled Water.

Later on, they provided accompaniment on "Duncan", featured on Simon's second solo album Paul Simon, and toured with Simon (as Urubamba) in the early 1970s, appearing on the Live Rhymin' album and releasing a pair of albums under their new name.  In later years, they reverted to their original name of Los Incas and released several more albums on the French Buda Records label.

Members
 Jorge Milchberg — charango
 Rob Yaffee — cello
 Olivier Milchberg — guitar, quena
 Lupe  Vega — vocals
 Juan Dalera — quena
 Moises Arnaiz — guitar
 Jorge Transante — percussion
 Carlos Miguel Benn

Discography
 Chants et Danses d'Amérique Latine, 1956
 L'Amérique du Soleil, 1960
 Terres de Soleil, 1962
 Amérique Latine, 1964
 Special Danse (EP), 1965
 Bolivie, 1965
 Pérou, 1965
 Succés Originaux, 1967
 Le Rapace (EP), 1967
 Los Incas, 1968
 Inedits, 1969
 El Cóndor Pasa, 1970
 El Viento, 1971
 Special Danse (EP 2), 1972
 La Fiesta, 1973
 Urubamba (as Urubamba), 1974
 Río Abierto, 1977
 Un Pedazo de Infinito (as Urubamba), 1982
 La Porte du Silence, 1985
 Alegria, 1988
 La Plume de l'Oeuf, 1991
 Los Incas en Concert, 2000 (Live Album)
 El Último, 2002
 Salvados del Olvido, 2011 
 Reprise en ligne (EP), 2018

References

External links
Official site Home

Andean music
Musical groups established in 1956
1956 establishments in France